Michael Cresap Sprigg (July 1, 1791 – December 18, 1845) was a U.S. Representative from Maryland, brother of James Cresap Sprigg.

Born in Frostburg, Maryland, Sprigg completed preparatory studies.  He held a number of local offices, and served as member of the Maryland House of Delegates in 1821, 1823, 1837, 1840, and 1844.  He served as president of the Chesapeake and Ohio Canal Company in 1841 and 1842.

Sprigg was elected as a Jacksonian to the Twentieth and Twenty-first Congresses, serving from March 4, 1827, to March 3, 1831.  In Congress, he served as chairman of the Committee on Expenditures on Public Buildings (Twentieth and Twenty-first Congresses).  He died in Cumberland, Maryland, and is interred in Rose Hill Cemetery.

References

External links 
 

1791 births
1845 deaths
Members of the Maryland House of Delegates
People from Frostburg, Maryland
Jacksonian members of the United States House of Representatives from Maryland
19th-century American politicians
Sprigg family
Burials at Rose Hill Cemetery (Cumberland, Maryland)
Politicians from Cumberland, Maryland